Pierre-Yves Montagnat (born March 5, 1986) is a professional rugby union fullback or winger currently playing for Lyon OU in the Pro D2, for whom he signed on June 5, 2009 after two years spent at Oyonnax.

After leaving Bourgoin's youth system, where he won the 2007 Coupe Frantz Reichel (the French under-21 championship), Montagnat joined the nearby Pro D2 club Oyonnax. 
During his second season there, he finished as the top point scorer in the 2008–09 Rugby Pro D2 season with 336 points.

References

1986 births
Living people
French rugby union players
Rugby union fullbacks
Rugby union wings